Andrew Kevin Hamilton (born 28 March 1953) is a British tenor saxophonist who has played with Duran Duran, Wham!, Elton John, Pet Shop Boys, Tina Turner, George Michael, Paul McCartney, Radiohead, Bon Jovi, David Bowie, Ben E. King, Dexy's Midnight Runners, Brian May, Stereophonics and more.

Career 

After picking up the saxophone when he was 15, Andy spent the early 1970's playing for 'Smiling Hard'  at The Top Ten Club on the Reeperbahn. They went on to tour Europe and Australia and were often hired by US artists, notably playing for Edwin Starr and Ben E. King. In 1979, Andy recorded H.A.P.P.Y. Radio and toured America with Edwin Starr.

Upon moving back to London, Andy met Tony Visconti, later playing on several Visconti productions. Through this, Andy met Colin Thurston and went on to record the 'Night Version' of Planet Earth. Andy toured alongside Duran Duran during the 1980's and played a saxophone solo on Rio. Andy did three World Tours alongside the Durans – Sing Blue Silver from 1983–84, and The Strange Behaviour Tour in 1987 promoting Notorious, where he met and performed alongside Lou Reed. Andy later toured worldwide with the reunited Durans during their 2003 reunion tour.

In 1982, Andy joined Dexy's Midnight Runners, whom he toured extensively with in the US and Europe during their rise to fame after their single Come On Eileen. After being pulled off stage one night in France, Andy met David Bowie, who let Andy feature in some music videos, notably Wild Is the Wind and The Drowned Girl.

Andy joined The Boomtown Rats and recorded an album V Deep before extensively touring with them, and performing at Live Aid.

In 1984, Andy performed as a musician in Give My Regards to Broad Street, a film written by Paul McCartney.

During the mid 1980s, Andy met George Michael, and recorded many Wham! records such as I'm Your Man and The Edge of Heaven. He also featured in many of their music videos. He later supported George during his solo career, recording (and touring) multiple studio albums, such as Faith, Listen Without Prejudice Vol. 1 and Older. It was with George when Andy performed the saxophone solo of Desafinado with Astrud Gilberto, and recorded on Don't Let the Sun Go Down On Me with Elton John. Andy was part of the 25 Live tour, where George held the first concert at the newly built Wembley Stadium.

During Andy's career, he recorded and toured with many other artists. He recorded with Tina Turner on the album Nutbush City Limits (album), as well as others. Andy recorded on the Bilingual album with the Pet Shop Boys. He played on multiple Judie Tzuke albums, and toured to promote one of them. He toured extensively with Eros Ramazzotti and was Musical Director of ABC for a couple of years.  Andy recorded on the Radiohead album Kid A and toured with the band in Paris and New York. He also recorded with Kim Wilde, Bon Jovi, Brian May, Gary Barlow, Marc Almond, Nina Hagen, Altered Images and many more.

He has recently toured alongside Dire Straits Legacy.

Andy Hamilton has composed theme and incidental music for television and film in both the US and the UK. He has a songwriting partnership with guitarist Phil Palmer, and they won the UK Songwriting Contest in 2015 with the song "Everything's Great All The Time". As well as saxophones, Hamilton also plays keyboards and EWI (Electronic Wind Instrument).

References

External links 
Official website
Discogs

1953 births
Living people
British male saxophonists
British session musicians
21st-century saxophonists
21st-century British male musicians